Microcosm is a 3D rail shooter video game developed and published by Psygnosis in 1993. It was originally developed for the FM Towns, and also ported for the Sega Mega-CD,  Amiga CD32, 3DO, and MS-DOS. Microcosm featured realistic FMV animation, with the graphics being rendered on Silicon Graphics workstations. The game is either in first-person or third-person view depending on the gaming system.

Plot
Set in the year of 2051 AD, the game takes place in a dystopian futuristic setting on an alien planet called Bodor, located in the Bator System, where the galaxy's two largest conglomerates — Cybertech, considered the more compassionate of the two,  and Axiom, thought to be the more oppressive corporation — compete to achieve premier status in the business world, a position known as CORP 1. Because of heavy mining operations on the planet from the corporations, most of Bodor is uninhabitable due to pollution, forcing 87% of the population onto 2% of the planet's land. Because of this, poverty, crime and disease are rampant in the cities. Axiom also claims that Cybertech is responsible for the death of Axiom's former president. Axiom injects Cybertech president Tiron Korsby's body with microscopic droids designed to penetrate his brain and control his mind. Cybertech, however, learns of this plan and injects Korsby with their own piloted submarines shrunken down to a microscopic size to destroy Axiom's droids and prevent them from controlling Korsby's mind.

Development
The game used the latest Silicon Graphics computers at the time to render the graphics as realistically as possible. In 1991, the game was first seen in a demo for the Amiga CDTV. A port for the CD-i was planned and then canceled, but a prototype exists. The lead platform was the FM Towns, and development was funded in part by Fujitsu with the aim of making it a launch title for the console-styled version of the platform, the FM Towns Marty. The game engine was later purchased by Fujitsu for £250,000. The DOS and FM Towns versions feature an exclusive soundtrack by Rick Wakeman, which was replaced in other versions with a soundtrack by Tim Wright for licensing reasons. A promotional version of the game was later developed for Pfizer.

Reception

Critics generally rated Microcosm as having excellent graphics but very limited and poorly designed gameplay. Amiga Format, for instance, greatly praised the Amiga CD32 version's graphics and soundtrack, but described the gameplay as "a merely slightly better than average" rail shooter. In a 1995 second review, they lowered their score from 87% to 40%, mocking their earlier review's emphasis of graphics over gameplay and describing the game as "a decidedly average Space Harrier clone that certainly looks great, but plays horribly". Amiga Power similarly described Microcosm as a Space Harrier clone with extremely limited interactivity and little variations in the visuals, giving the game a 44%. CU Amiga gave the Amiga CD32 version an 86%, saying that the graphics are not nearly as good as the FM Towns version, with enemy sprites that look "pasted on", but that the gameplay is considerably improved.

Reviewing the Sega CD version, GamePro opined that Microcosm represents a good concept for FMV games, but that the poor level design reduces the gameplay to trial-and-error and takes away the fun. Electronic Gaming Monthly similarly commented that the game concept is good, but the gameplay is "repetitious and boring." They scored it a 5.4 out of 10.

Computer Gaming World in June 1994 said that the DOS version was "a very basic shooter" with "simplistic, even brainless" gameplay. While praising the "polished graphics and animation" and "equally excellent" music, the magazine concluded that despite "cool technology and a 'cinematic feel' ... Psygnosis forgot to make a game".

Electronic Gaming Monthly'''s four reviewers gave the 3DO version a unanimous score of 4 out of 10, commenting that the graphics are a huge improvement over the Sega CD version. but that the gameplay is still shallow and "just not fun". Next Generation'' reviewed the 3DO version of the game, rating it two stars out of five, and stated that "This is one of those games one can never describe as challenging, only as frustrating."

Editions
The limited edition copy of the PC and Amiga CD32 versions of the game contains the game, the manual, a soundtrack CD and a T-shirt.

Notes

References

External links
Microcosm at MobyGames
Microcosm at the Hall of Light

1993 video games
3DO Interactive Multiplayer games
Cancelled CD-i games
Amiga CD32 games
Creative Assembly games
DOS games
Dystopian video games
Fiction set in 2051
FM Towns games
Full motion video based games
Human body in popular culture
Nanotechnology in fiction
Psygnosis games
Rail shooters
Science fiction video games
Scrolling shooters
Sega CD games
Single-player video games
Video games about microbes
Video games about robots
Video games about size change
Video games scored by Tim Wright (Welsh musician)
Video games set in the 2050s
Video games set on fictional planets
Video games developed in the United Kingdom